The election to the city council of Greater Berlin from December 5, 1948 took place in exceptional circumstances. The last election had occurred just two years earlier; however, since then the city had been separated into East and West. These elections were held only in the Western sectors accordingly. Moreover, West Berlin was experiencing a blockade since June 1948 from the outside world and was only surviving due to the airlift. Against this background, the elections to the city council took place.

Aftermath

The Social Democratic Party (SPD) experienced its largest ever election victory. They increased their share of the vote by 15.8 percentage points to receive 64.5% of the votes, the highest percentage that has ever been achieved by a party in a democratic election in Germany. The Christian Democratic Union (CDU) slumped by 2.8 percentage points to 19.4% of the vote, while the Free Democratic Party (FDP) improved its showing to 16.1% of the vote. The Socialist Unity Party did not compete in these elections to the West Berlin City Council which they regarded as illegitimate.

Although the SPD had a clear absolute majority, due to the complex political situation it formed a unity coalition with the CDU and the FDP. Consequently, Social Democrat Ernst Reuter was elected mayor of West Berlin.

Results

|-style="background:#E9E9E9;"
! colspan="2" style="text-align:left;" |Parties
!Votes
!%
!+/-
!Seats
!+/-
|-
| width=5px style="background-color: " |
| style="text-align:left;" | Social Democratic Party of Germany
| 858,461
| 64.5%
| +15.8%
| 76
| +13
|-
| style="background-color: " |
| style="text-align:left;" | Christian Democratic Union of Germany
| 258,664
| 19.4%
| -2.8%
| 26
| -3
|-
| style="background-color: " |
| style="text-align:left;" | Free Democratic Party
| 214,145
| 16.1%
| +6.8%
| 17
| +5
|- style="background:#E9E9E9;"
! colspan="2" style="text-align:left;" |Total
! style="text-align:center;" | 1,331,270
! style="text-align:center;" colspan="2"| 100%
! style="text-align:center;" | 119
! style="text-align:center;" | -11
|-
|colspan=7|Source
|}

State election, 1948
1948 elections in Germany
December 1948 events in Europe